George, Georg or Georges Wagner may refer to:

Public officials
George D. Wagner (1829–1869), American general and state official
G. Harold Wagner (1900–1960), Pennsylvania State Treasurer and Pennsylvania State Auditor General
George Wagner, postmaster who named Rosecrans, Sugar Valley, Pennsylvania
George Wagner, candidate in 1970 California gubernatorial election
Georg Wagner, mayor of Spatzenhausen
Georg Wagner, mayor of Aholfing
George Wagner, candidate in 1975 Saskatchewan general election
George O. Wagner (born 1946), American state legislator

Sports personalities
George Raymond Wagner (1915–1963), American professional wrestler, aka "Gorgeous George"
George Wagner (tennis) 1907 U.S. National Championships – Men's Singles

Others
George Wagner House, on List of New York State Historic Markers in Albany County, New York
George Wagner, hanged in 1867, see List of people executed in New York
George Wagner, founder of Wagner Motorcycle Company
Georg Wagner (1849–1903), (Yegor Yegorovich Vagner) elucidated the structure of carvone
George Wagner, father of Robert Wagner of Robert Wagner House
Dr. George Wagner, who campaigned about the British Library's location
George Wagner, who helped rehabilitate prostitutes at Wykeham Terrace, Brighton
George Wagner (bishop) (1930–1993), German Eastern Orthodox archbishop
George Wagner, founder of Leavenworth Nutcracker Museum
George Wagner Jr., horse breeder, see Georgian Grande Horse
George Wagner (zoologist), see Deepwater cisco
George Wagner III, a suspect in the Pike County shootings

Characters
George Wagner, character in the film Are You Listening?

See also
George Wagner Hale (1894–1945), American baseball catcher
George Waggner (1894–1984), American director
George Wagoner (disambiguation)
Wagner (surname)